Radwa Ashour (26 May 1946 – 30 November 2014) was an Egyptian novelist.

Life
Ashour was born in El-Manial to Mustafa Ashour, a lawyer and literature enthusiast, and Mai Azzam, a poet and an artist. She graduated from Cairo University with a BA degree in 1967. In 1972, she received her MA in Comprehensive Literature from the same university. In 1975, Ashour graduated from the University of Massachusetts Amherst with a PhD in African American Literature. Her dissertation was entitled The search for a Black poetics: a study of Afro-American critical writings. While preparing for her PhD, Ashour was remarked as the first doctoral candidate in English who studied the literature of the African-American. She taught at Ain Shams University, Cairo.
Between 1969 and 1980, Ashour's mainly focused on studying, raising up her son and playing an active role as an activist. She married Palestinian poet Mourid Barghouti in 1970. She gave birth to her son, poet Tamim al-Barghouti, in 1977. In that same year, Ashour's husband, Mourid Barghouthi was deported from Egypt to Hungary. As she and her son stayed in Cairo, they used to make frequent visits to Mourid.

Ashour died on 30 November 2014 after months of long-term health problems.

Tribute
On 26 May 2018, Google Doodle commemorated Radwa Ashour's 72nd birthday.

Works
The Journey: Memoirs of an Egyptian Student in America, 1983
Warm Stone, 1985
Khadija and Sawsan, 1989
I Saw the Date Palms, short stories, 1989

 Specters, Translated Barbara Romaine, Interlink Books, 2010, 
Al-Tantouria, 2010

Athqal Min Radwa, 2013 ISBN 9789770932636
li Kull Al Mqhoorin Ajnih'a, 2019 
Faraj.

As editor

Awards
In 1994, Granada Trilogy won the year award of the Cairo International Book Fair
In 1995, Granada Trilogy won the prize of The First Arab Woman Book Fair in Cairo.
In 2007, Ashour won Constantine Cavafy Prize for Literature
In 2011, Ashour won Owais Prize.

Translations of Ashour's Work
Granada Trilogy was translated into Spanish and English
Siraj was translated into English.
Atyaaf was translated into Italian.
She has a number of short stories that were published in English, French, Italian, German and Spanish.
Translated in Tamil by Dr. P. M. M. Irfan, August 2021

References

External links
Githa Hariharan in Conversation with Radwa Ashour and Ahdaf Souief, Newsclick, 6 April 2010
"Radwa Ashour: As one long prepared", Al Ahram, Youssef Rakha, 27 January – 2 February 2000

Writing, Teaching, Living: Egyptian Novelist Radwa Ashour, Arab Literature, 19 March 2011

Egyptian novelists
Egyptian women writers
1946 births
2014 deaths
Writers from Cairo
Cairo University alumni
University of Massachusetts Amherst alumni
Academic staff of Ain Shams University
20th-century novelists
20th-century women writers